Robinson 2023 is the twenty-third season of the Swedish reality television series Robinson. This season will see  Anders Lundin returning as presenter for the first time since 2003. The season premiered on 19 March 2023 on TV4.

Contestants 
This years contestants will be teamed up according to age, one team with older and one team with younger contestants.

Challenges

Voting History

References

External links

Expedition Robinson Sweden seasons
TV4 (Sweden) original programming